The 1896–97 Penn Quakers men's ice hockey season was the inaugural season of play for the program.

Season

After seeing Yale and Johns Hopkins play the first intercollegiate game the year before, George Orton a graduate student from Canada, organized the first ice hockey team for Pennsylvania University. The Quakers won their first game against Columbia with William Agnew recording the first hat-trick in program history.

Pennsylvania's season was hampered by a lack of local facilities, something that Orton would fix the following year when he helped build the first indoor rink in the Philadelphia area, the West Park Ice Palace.

Roster

Standings

Schedule and Results

|-
!colspan=12 style=";" | Regular Season

References

Penn Quakers men's ice hockey seasons
Penn
Penn
Penn
Penn